Sesiosa is a genus of longhorn beetles of the subfamily Lamiinae, containing the following species:

 Sesiosa laosensis Breuning, 1968
 Sesiosa subfasciata Pascoe, 1865

References

Pteropliini